Gond-Pontouvre is a commune in the Charente department in southwestern France. It is about 3 km north of the centre of Angoulême.

Population

See also
Communes of the Charente department

References

External links

Official site

Communes of Charente